Christmas EP is the third EP by the Denver-based rock band, the Fray. It was released for the 2009 Christmas season as a free download for anyone who signed up for their new fan club. The EP contains acoustic cover versions of popular Christmas carols.

Track list
 O come, O come, Emmanuel - 4.55
 Silent Night - 2.17
 Noel - 4.57
 Oh Come All Ye Faithful - 2.37
 Away in a Manger - 2.09

References

The Fray albums
2009 EPs
2009 Christmas albums
Christmas albums by American artists
Folk Christmas albums
Christmas EPs